Agrisius guttivitta is a moth of the subfamily Arctiinae first described by Francis Walker in 1855. It is found in Sikkim, India.

References

Moths described in 1855
Lithosiini
Moths of Asia